Ellis Ames (1809-1886) was an American lawyer and politician who sat in the Massachusetts General Court from 1833 to 1836. He was educated at Bridgewater Academy and Brown University. Ellis Ames was a member of the Ames family, descended from William Ames.

References

1809 births
1886 deaths
Brown University alumni
Members of the Massachusetts General Court
19th-century American politicians
19th-century American judges